Eudonia dinodes is a moth in the family Crambidae. It was named by Edward Meyrick in 1884. This species is endemic to New Zealand.

The wingspan is about 17 mm. The forewings are white, irrorated with dark fuscous. The basal area is spotted with black. The hindwings are whitish-grey, the hindmargin is darker grey. Adults have been recorded on wing in January.

References

Moths described in 1884
Eudonia
Endemic fauna of New Zealand
Moths of New Zealand
Taxa named by Edward Meyrick
Endemic moths of New Zealand